Hidayah is an Arabic word meaning guidance.  It is commonly spelled as hidaya, hedaya, and (in its Persian form) hedayat.

Hidayah may also refer to:

Al-Hidayah, an influential work of Islamic jurisprudence by Burhan al-Din al-Marghinani
Al Hidayah (organisation)
Al Hidayah Mosque

See also 
Hedayat family
Hedayat Mosque
Tafsir Hedayat